Cedron is an unincorporated community in northern Moniteau County, in the U.S. state of Missouri. The community was on a ridge above Schaaf Creek approximately 2.5 miles southeast of Prairie Home in adjacent Cooper County. It lies within the current Prairie Home Conservation Area.

History
A post office called Cedron was established in 1896, and remained in operation until 1907. The name Cedron is derived from the Kidron Valley, in West Asia.

References

Unincorporated communities in Moniteau County, Missouri
Unincorporated communities in Missouri
Jefferson City metropolitan area